Isa Air Base, formerly known as Shaikh Isa Air Base , is located on the island nation of Bahrain.  Isa Air Base is located on the shore of the Persian Gulf in southern Bahrain.

It hosts the Royal Bahraini Air Force (RBAF) Fighter Wing and the two squadrons that comprise it.

History

During the first Gulf War, some of the Coalition forces, having trouble with the Arab pronunciation, knew the base under the name "Shakey's Pizza".

Current use

Bahrain

The base is home to the RBAF's 1st Fighter Wing:

 1st Fighter Squadron – Lockheed Martin F-16 Fighting Falcon C/D Block 40
 2nd Fighter Squadron – F-16C/D Block 40
 6th Fighter Squadron – Northrop F-5E/F
 5th Squadron – British Aerospace Hawk
 4th Squadron – Slingsby T-67 Firefly

United States

In March 2009, the United States Air Force established a camp on Isa Air Base to support aerial port operations.  The unit was designated a detachment of the 379th Air Expeditionary Wing of Al Udeid Air Base, Qatar.  This detachment's purpose was to accelerate the delivery of mine-resistant ambush-protected all-terrain vehicles to U.S. forces in Afghanistan.

As part of its operations against ISIL, the United States has deployed various aircraft there.

As of August 27, 2020, KBR is in charge of base operations support services at Isa Air Base.

References

External links
 Shaikh Isa Air Base / Sheik Isa Airbase, Bahrain - Global Security.org

Military installations of Bahrain
Airports in Bahrain